Dréan is a small coastal town in Algeria, 25 km south of Annaba, in El Taref Province. It has a population of about 40,000. The author Albert Camus was born there during the French rule in Algeria when it was known as Mondovi. It is the capital of Dréan District.

Communes of El Taref Province